Martial Club (武館) ( Instructors of Death) is a 1981 Shaw Brothers film directed by Lau Kar Leung, it is another of his lighthearted kung fu films starring Kara Hui, Hsiao Ho, Gordon Liu and Wang Lung Wei in a rare hero role.

Plot
After a series of lion dances in the opening minutes, Wong Fei Hung and his once-rival, now friend, find themselves and their martial arts schools pitted against a rival school which uses a kung fu expert Master Shan from the north to do their dirty work, although the expert doesn't realize he is being evil (they lie to him). After his friend Chu-Ying's brother is beat up in a brothel, Fei Hung goes to the rival school to confront them and Master Shan. There is also a mass kung fu "war" in a local theater which is the second highlight of the film, the first being an excellent fight in an alley between Fei Hung and Master Shan. This may be the only role in which Wang Lung Wei as the hero from the north isn't a villain. He fights Wong Fei Hung but once he discovers that he has been tricked by the bad school, he refuses to help them anymore.

Cast
Kara Hui – Chu-Ying
Hsiao Ho – Mai Chen-Huo
Wang Lung-wei – Master Shan
Gordon Liu – Wong Fei-hung
Ku Feng – Wong Chi-Ying

External links
IMDB

Films directed by Lau Kar-leung
1981 martial arts films
1981 films
Kung fu films
Hong Kong martial arts films
Shaw Brothers Studio films
1980s Hong Kong films